MWD may refer to:

 Matte World Digital, an American visual effects company
 Measurement while drilling, a procedure used in oil well drilling
 Metropolitan Water District, a water wholesale supplier to local cities in Southern California, United States
 Military working dog, used in warfare
 Murakami-Wolf-Dublin, American animation studio
 PAF Base M.M. Alam (IATA code), a Pakistan Air Force airbase located at Mianwali, Pakistan